Dive RAID International (formerly RAID) is a dive training organization which was founded in 2007 by Barry Coleman to support diver training for the Poseidon Mk VI Discovery Rebreather. It has since extended its scope to include open circuit scuba training and training for both recreational and technical diving sectors as well as snorkeling and freediving.

History
RAID was founded in 2007 by Barry Coleman  to support diver training required for the Poseidon Mk VI Discovery Rebreather. RAID first developed training for rebreathers, they have since extended their programmes to include open circuit courses at both the recreational and technical levels. Barry Coleman is still working for RAID. RAID offers a complete range of online diver academic programs from beginner to instructor examiner levels in snorkeling, scuba and freediving.

Barry Coleman sold shares to Jim Holiday and Paul V. Toomer in 2014. Jim Holiday was CEO / President until 2018. During this time RAID experienced exceptional growth. Paul V. Toomer, previously  Director of Technical Training for Scuba Schools International, was appointed as Director of Diver Training for RAID in 2014, and President in 2019.

In June 2016 RAID joined the United States Recreational Scuba Training Council  as the first associate member. July 2016 they partnered with the Dive Pirates Foundation to bring adaptive scuba to more dive centers. Adaptive training is a system for adapting the skills training procedures to a better fit for the individual disabled but otherwise medically fit diver's personal requirements and abilities. The same theory, and skills training and assessment is used as for other divers.

In October 2017, RAID obtained European Underwater Federation certification.
In April 2018 RAID is purchased by Kalkomey Enterprises, LLC to expand their range of outdoor courses.

Recognition
RAID is a member of the United States Recreational Scuba Training Council (RSTC).

RAID is a member of the Rebreather Training Council.

RAID obtained CEN and ISO certification from the EUF certification body in October 2017 for the following certifications:

ISO 24801-2 - RAID Open Water 20
ISO 24801-3 - RAID Dive Master
ISO 24802-2 - RAID Open Circuit Instructor
ISO 11107 - RAID Nitrox Speciality
ISO 11121 - RAID Try Open Circuit Diving
ISO 13293 - RAID O2 Service and Gas Blender

Certification issued by RAID is approved by the UK Health and Safety Executive for divers whose duties are described in regulations 10, 12, and 13 of the Diving at Work Regulations 1997.

Training system

RAID differs from the rest of the industry by having a comprehensive online training system. RAID claims to have the most advanced training model in the industry today, with over 60 programs online.
Their no classroom approach covers their entire spectrum of training from snorkeling to rebreather diving. Delivering theory training online with no paper, no book and no plastic has allowed them to claim they have zero environmental impact. Once a course is passed the learner has lifetime access to that material. However, if a course is not completed in 6 months the learner will have to re-register. Academic material and certification are linked to the registration so, each student must register for their own class. Classes are available via an app on mobile device for both Android  and IOS.

Certifications

Recreational Diving Courses
Try Scuba Diving
Junior Scuba Diver (Ages 12 to 14)
Junior Open Water Diver (Ages 12 to 14)
Scuba Diver
Open Water 20
Explorer 30
Advanced 35
Master Rescue Diver

Professional Recreational Courses
Divemaster
Open Water Scuba Instructor
Open Circuit Try Dive Instructor
Master Instructor

Rebreather Courses

Try Rebreather
Rebreather Level 1 Open Water: Basic no-decompression training in diving with rebreathers for non-divers and open circuit divers to 20 metres.
Level 2
Level 3
Level 4
Specialty Rebreather

Professional Rebreather Courses
Sport Rebreather Instructor: Instructor training to teach no-decompression diving on RAID approved rebreathers or open circuit to depths not exceeding 40 metres.

Technical Diving Courses
RAID Technical programmes develop the diver to dive beyond recreational limits and incur decompression obligations.

Open Circuit Tech Scuba Courses

OC Deco 40M/132 ft
OC Deco 50M/164 ft

Professional Open Circuit Tech Courses 
OC Inst. Deco 50M/164 ft

Closed Circuit Rebreather Tech Courses
RB Deco 40M/132 ft
RB Deco 50M/164 ft
RB Deco 60M/197 ft

Professional Closed Circuit Tech Courses
RB Inst. Deco 50M/164 ft
RB Inst. Deco 60M/197 ft

Freediving Courses
WSF Basic Freediver
WSF Freediver
WSF Advanced Freediver
WSF Master Freediver
WSF Surf Survival

See also

Scuba diving
List of diver certification organizations
Recreational diver training

References

External links
Official site

Underwater diving training organizations